Sámuel Kálnoky (1640–1706) was a member of Kálnoky family who served as the chancellor of Transylvania.

Sámuel Kálnoky became the first chancellor of Transylvania in Vienna and received the rank of count by the Habsburgs (1697 full title: count Kálnoky baron of Kőröspatak).

References

Bibliography
 Révai Nagy Lexikona

External links 
 
 Kálnoky Sámuel

People from Sibiu County
1640 births
1706 deaths
17th-century Austrian people
18th-century Austrian people
18th-century Hungarian people
Austrian nobility